Homer is a village in Champaign County, Illinois, United States. Its population was 1,073 at the 2020 census.

History 
Homer grew from a settlement named Union, which was on the Fort Clark or State Road running between Danville and Urbana, nearly three miles north of the present town. Union was little more than several cabins built in 1829-30, but it served as a post office and meeting place in what was Vermilion County prior to the creation of Champaign County in 1833. Moses Thomas, a native of Pennsylvania, built a mill on the Salt Fork creek southeast of Union in 1834 and began to mill grain. A young merchant traveling from Indiana, Michael Doctor Coffeen, built a store adjacent to the mill, and with Thomas created the village of Homer on January 26, 1837. The post office was moved to Homer with M. D. Coffeen as postmaster in 1841.

Homer grew to 120 people in 1850, and the coming of the Great Western Railroad to the south of the town prompted the village to move to its present location. In February 1855, the town's 32 buildings were dragged 1.5 miles south by 18 teams of oxen. The village became a stop on the railway, later named the Wabash Railroad, becoming the center of agriculture in eastern Champaign County.

In 1905, the town became the location for Homer Park, an amusement park on the Illinois Traction System interurban line. Homer Park, north of the village on the Salt Fork creek, offered swimming, food, baseball, movies and even a small zoo. The park closed in 1937 after flooding and poor management.

Teachers strike
The Homer School District, which served the village and the surrounding area, set a record for the longest teacher's strike in the nation's history, spanning from October 26, 1986, to June 23, 1987. At 156 days, the strike was more than twice as long as the second-longest, set by a school district near Cleveland, Ohio during the 2002-2003 school year. At issue throughout the negotiations was the salary formula, which the Chicago Tribune reported was "not likely to drastically change the pay rates of ... teachers." Other provisions included allowing teachers fired during the strike to be allowed to return with no loss of salary or seniority and the district's newly unionized support staff getting a 6 percent pay increase beginning July 1, and an additional 2 percent increase at the beginning of the 1988-1989 school year. Legal fees were estimated to be $150,000.

Although the strike lasted 156 days, students only lost 11 days of class time as strikebreaking teachers were hired to teach classes. However, some families moved from Homer or paid tuition to have their children attend neighboring schools. The Homer School District eventually consolidated with the Allerton-Broadlands-Longview School District (located to Homer's south), many of the teachers left and all but two school board members either did not seek re-election or were defeated in the first election after the settlement. The town suffered from the effects of the strike for many years, according to a 2006 article in The News Gazette of Champaign-Urbana.

Geography
Homer is located at  (40.034972, -87.958986).

This Homer should not be confused with the former village of Homer, now called Troy Grove nor the Homer Glen area of Will County in Homer Township.

Demographics

As of the 2020 census there were 1,073 people, 519 households, and 347 families residing in the village. The racial makeup of the village was 91.89% White, 0.19% African American, 0.84% Asian, 0.47% from other races, and 6.62% from two or more races. Hispanic or Latino of any race were 2.24% of the population.

There were 519 households, out of which 69.36% had children under the age of 18 living with them, 42.39% were married couples living together, 17.73% had a female householder with no husband present, and 33.14% were non-families. 30.83% of all households were made up of individuals, and 9.06% had someone living alone who was 65 years of age or older. The average household size was 3.18 and the average family size was 2.54.

The village's age distribution consisted of 28.8% under the age of 18, 11.8% from 18 to 24, 28.3% from 25 to 44, 19.2% from 45 to 64, and 11.8% who were 65 years of age or older. The median age was 30.9 years. For every 100 females, there were 101.5 males. For every 100 females age 18 and over, there were 86.5 males.

The median income for a household in the village was $65,347, and the median income for a family was $81,750. Males had a median income of $58,750 versus $22,059 for females. The per capita income for the village was $44,604. About 12.1% of families and 10.6% of the population were below the poverty line, including 16.0% of those under age 18 and 9.0% of those age 65 or over.

References

 Raymond Kelly Cunningham Jr. and Molly Shoaf. "From the Timber to the Prairie: A History of Homer Illinois Volume I."

External links

 Village of Homer Illinois Homepage

Villages in Champaign County, Illinois
Villages in Illinois
Populated places established in 1855
1855 establishments in Illinois